Khan Qeshlaqi-ye Yek (also Romanized as Khān Qeshlāqī-ye Yek; also known as Khān Qeshlāq and Khān Qeshlāqī) is a village in Savalan Rural District, in the Central District of Parsabad County, Ardabil Province, Iran. At the 2006 census, its population was 571, in 116 families.

References 

Towns and villages in Parsabad County